The 8th New Zealand Parliament was a term of the New Zealand Parliament.

Elections for this term were held in 4 Māori electorates and 91 general electorates on 8 and 9 December 1881, respectively. A total of 95 MPs were elected, i.e. multi-member electorates were no longer used. Parliament was prorogued in June 1884. During the term of this Parliament, three Ministries were in power.

Sessions

The 8th Parliament opened on 18 May 1882, following the 1881 general election. It sat for three sessions, and was prorogued on 27 June 1884.

Historical context

Political parties had not been established yet; this only happened after the 1890 election. Anyone attempting to form an administration thus had to win support directly from individual MPs. This made first forming, and then retaining a government difficult and challenging.

Ministries

The Hall Ministry under Premier John Hall had been in power since 8 October 1879. This ministry lasted until 21 April 1882. It was succeeded by the Whitaker Ministry, which lasted until 25 September 1883. The second Atkinson Ministry succeeded it. This Ministry finished on 16 August 1884, just after the 1884 general election for the 9th Parliament.

Electorates
Ninety-one general and four Māori electorates were used for the 1881 elections, i.e. the previous multi-member electorates were abolished. The changes were the result of the Representation Act 1881. The previous electoral redistribution was undertaken in 1875 for the 1875–1876 election. In the six years since, New Zealand's European population had increased by 65%. In the 1881 electoral redistribution, the House of Representatives increased the number of European representatives to 91 (up from 84 since the 1875–76 election). The number of Māori electorates was held at four.

These changes necessitated a major disruption to existing boundaries.

Initial composition of the 8th Parliament
95 seats were created across the electorates.

Changes during term
There were a number of changes during the term of the 8th Parliament.

Notes

References

08